The Taitung Incinerator is an incinerator in Taitung City, Taitung County, Taiwan.

History
The construction of the incinerator began in 2001. The construction was completed five years later in 2006 and trial operation started afterwards. However, the Taitung County Government soon refuse to approve the land where the incinerator stands to be used for it to become operational. In 2011, legal case arises between the incinerator contractor and the county government, resulting the county government to buy back the plant and the land for NT$1.96 billion. Soon later, the county government decided to relaunch the incinerator. On 15 February 2022, the county government began to retest the incinerator for a planned operation in June 2022.

See also
 Air pollution in Taiwan
 Waste management in Taiwan

References

Buildings and structures in Taitung County
Incinerators in Taiwan
Infrastructure completed in 2006